The FORJA Concertation Party is a political party in Argentina. It was founded in 2008 as a split from the Radical Civic Union. The party now forms part of the Frente de Todos, the ruling coalition supporting President Alberto Fernández. At the time of its foundation and until the alliance's dissolution, the party was a member of the Front for Victory.

The party counts with minor representation in the Argentine Chamber of Deputies: Mabel Caparrós, national deputy from Tierra del Fuego, was elected in 2019. In 2019, FORJA also gained its first-ever provincial governor: Gustavo Melella, also of Tierra del Fuego.

History 
The party takes its name from the historical organization FORJA, which existed from 1935 to 1945. Like the historical Forja, the Concertation Party is of Radical origins but is ideologically and politically closer to Peronism.

Electoral performance

President

See also
Radicales K
Front for Victory
Plural Consensus

References

External links
Official website 

Political parties established in 2008
2008 establishments in Argentina
Center-left parties in Argentina
Kirchnerism
Peronist parties and alliances in Argentina
Radical Civic Union